This is a timeline documenting the events of heavy metal in the year 2016.

Bands formed
 Cellar Darling
 Invidia
 Lovebites
 Memoriam
 Nothing Left
 Pillorian
 Prophets of Rage
 Sinsaenum
 Vimic
 VUUR

Bands disbanded
 Agalloch
 Bolt Thrower
 Crucified Barbara
 Eths
 For Today
 I, the Breather
 Kylesa (hiatus)
 Lionheart
 ReVamp
 Scar the Martyr
 Sockweb
 Twisted Sister
 Wodensthrone

Bands reformed
 Abandon All Ships
 Akercocke
 Battlelore (hiatus from 2011 to 2016)
 Decadence
 Demolition Hammer
 Destroy the Runner
 Esprit D'Air
 Evildead
 Massacration
 Massacre
 Nasty Savage
 Nitro
 The Obsessed
 Pestilence
 Power Quest
 Ratt
 Scissorfight
 The Union Underground

Events

 On April 28, 2015, Black Sabbath announced that they will embark on their final tour.
 On July 5, 2015, Blackmore's Night and former Deep Purple and Rainbow guitarist Ritchie Blackmore announced that he will briefly return to rock music by performing a few shows in June.
 On January 14, Lacuna Coil announced that guitarist Marco Biazzi has left the band.
 On February 10, Skeletonwitch announced Adam Clemans as their new vocalist.
 On February 20, Suicidal Tendencies announced Dave Lombardo (formerly of Slayer) as the drummer for their U.S. tour with Megadeth, which took place in February and March. Lombardo will drum for Suicidal Tendencies again on their summer European tour.
 On March 19, Underoath played their first show since disbanding in 2013 at Self Help Festival in California.
 On March 31, Martin Henriksson announced that he has quit Dark Tranquillity due to loss of passion for playing music.
 On April 16 and April 23, Guns N' Roses reunited with their original guitarist Slash and bassist Duff McKagan for this year's Coachella.
 On April 16, Overkill played a special show in Oberhausen where they played the Feel the Fire and Horrorscope albums in their entirety. The show was professionally filmed and recorded for an upcoming DVD.
 On May 5, Eluveitie announced that they parted ways with drummer Merlin Sutter, vocalist Anna Murphy and guitarist Ivo Henzi.
 On August 6 and 7, Heavy Montreal took place presented by Evenko, and headliners were Nightwish, Disturbed, Five Finger Death Punch, Volbeat and Candlemass.

Deaths
 January 14 – Kevin Lawrence, guitarist of Rapidfire, died from multiple heart attacks at the age of 51.
 January 23 – Jimmy Bain, bassist of Rainbow and Dio, died from lung cancer at the age of 68.
 February 21 – Piotr Grudziński, guitarist of Riverside, died from sudden cardiac arrest at the age of 40.
 March 3 – John Thomas, former guitarist of Budgie, died from undisclosed reasons at the age of 63.
 March 3 – Oskar Karlsson, drummer of Gates of Ishtar, died from heart failure at the age of 39.
 March 13 – Nik Green, keyboardist of Blue Murder, died from cancer.
 April 5 – John Byrd, former guitarist of King Conquer, died from substance abuse.
 April 18 – Aleah Liane Stanbridge, vocalist of Trees of Eternity, died from cancer at the age of 39.
 May 21 – Nick Menza, former drummer of Megadeth, died from heart failure at the age of 51.
 May 31 – Brandon Ferrell, former drummer of Municipal Waste, died from undisclosed reasons.
 June 9 – Adam Young, multi-instrumentalist of Sockweb, died after committing suicide by hanging himself at the age of 28.
 August 13 – Jerry Clyde Paradis, former drummer of The Gates of Slumber and Sourvein, died from undisclosed reasons.
 August 17 – James Woolley, former keyboardist of Nine Inch Nails, died from undisclosed reasons at the age of 49.
 August 21 – Tom Searle, guitarist of Architects, died from cancer at the age of 28.
 August 25 – Norman Killeen, former drummer of Threat Signal, died from undisclosed reasons at the age of 38.
 September 10 – Pecu Cinnari, drummer of Tarot, died from a long-term illness at the age of 50.
 September 11 – Leonard Haze, former drummer of Y&T, died from chronic obstructive pulmonary disease at the age of 61.
 September 27 – Mike Taylor, former vocalist of Quartz, died from undisclosed reasons.
 September 27 – Brodie Wheeler, former guitarist of King Conquer, died from substance abuse.
 December 5 – Adam Sagan, former drummer of Circle II Circle and Into Eternity, died from blood cancer at the age of 36.
 December 23 – Mick Zane, guitarist of Malice, died from brain cancer.

Albums released

January

February

March

April

May

June

July

August

September

October

November

December

References

2010s in heavy metal music
Metal